The Uruguayan Paralympic Committee or CPU ( – CPU) is the private, non-profit organization representing Uruguayan Paralympic athletes in the International Paralympic Committee (IPC), the Parapan American Games and the South American Para Games. It is the governing body of Uruguayan Paralympic sport.

See also
Uruguay at the Paralympics
Uruguayan Olympic Committee

References

National Paralympic Committees
Paralympic
Uruguay at the Paralympics
Sports organizations established in 1996
1996 establishments in Argentina